Galina Savenko (March 28, 1966 – March 31, 2012) was a Soviet sprint canoer who competed from the late 1980s to the early 1990s. She won two bronze medals at the 1989 ICF Canoe Sprint World Championships in Plovdiv, earning them in the K-2 500 m and K-4 500 m events.

Savenko also competed in two Summer Olympics for two different nations. At the 1988 Summer Olympics in Seoul for the Soviet Union, she finished seventh in the K-1 500 m event. Four years later in Barcelona, Savenko competed for the Unified Team by finishing ninth in the K-4 500 m event though she was eliminated in the semifinals of the K-2 500 m event.

References

Galina Savenko's obituary 

1966 births
2012 deaths
Canoeists at the 1988 Summer Olympics
Canoeists at the 1992 Summer Olympics
Olympic canoeists of the Soviet Union
Olympic canoeists of the Unified Team
Soviet female canoeists
Russian female canoeists
ICF Canoe Sprint World Championships medalists in kayak